The National Media Council is a Polish government agency "with the right to hire and fire personnel for state television and radio", namely Telewizja Polska, the Polish Radio External Service and the Polish Press Agency. It was established in 2016.

References

2016 establishments in Poland
Mass media in Poland